The 2021 NCAA Division I Field Hockey Championship was the 41st annual tournament organized by the NCAA, to determine the national champion of Division I women's college field hockey in the United States. 

The semifinals and championship match were played at the Phyllis Ocker Field at the University of Michigan in Ann Arbor, Michigan on November 19 and 21, 2021.

Maine made their debut appearance in the national championship tournament.

Northwestern won their first NCAA title, and the school's ninth national title across all sports. During the tournament, they faced three-time defending national champion North Carolina, #2 seed Iowa, top scoring defense Harvard, and top scoring offense Liberty.

Qualified teams

 A total of 18 teams qualified for the 2021 tournament, a return to the pre-COVID pandemic format from 2019. 10 teams received automatic bids by winning their conference tournaments and an additional 8 teams earned at-large bids based on their regular season records.

Automatic qualifiers

At-large qualifiers

Bracket

See also 
NCAA Division II Field Hockey Championship
NCAA Division III Field Hockey Championship

References 

NCAA Division I Field Hockey Championship
NCAA Division I Field Hockey Championship
NCAA Division I Field Hockey Championship
NCAA Division I Field Hockey Championship
Sports in Ann Arbor, Michigan